Tom Trybull (born 9 March 1993) is a German professional footballer who plays as a defensive midfielder for Blackpool. He was a youth international for Germany on multiple levels.

Career
On 30 September 2016, Trybull scored his first league goal for ADO Den Haag in the Eredivisie in a 2–1 loss to PEC Zwolle.

On 4 August 2017, Trybull joined Norwich City on a one-year deal following a successful trial. On 22 August 2017, he scored his first goal for the club on his debut, in the EFL Cup, in a 4–1 home win over Charlton Athletic. On 1 January 2018, Trybull scored his first league goal for Norwich City in a 2–1 home win over Millwall. In the 2019–20 season, he made 16 appearances in the Premier League.

Trybull joined Blackburn Rovers on loan for the 2020–21 season.

On 26 August 2021, Trybull terminated his contract in Norwich; one day later, he signed a one-year contract with an option for another year at Hannover 96.

His contract in Hannover was terminated on 30 January 2022; he joined SV Sandhausen one day later.

In January 2023, having agreed the termination of his contract with SV Sandhausen, Trybull moved to EFL Championship side Blackpool, returning in England after a year and a half. He signed a contract until summer 2024, with the option of a further year.

Career statistics

Honours
Norwich City
EFL Championship: 2018–19

References

External links

1993 births
Living people
German footballers
Footballers from Berlin
Association football midfielders
Germany youth international footballers
FC Hansa Rostock players
SV Werder Bremen players
SV Werder Bremen II players
FC St. Pauli players
SpVgg Greuther Fürth players
ADO Den Haag players
Norwich City F.C. players
Blackburn Rovers F.C. players
Hannover 96 players
Hannover 96 II players
SV Sandhausen players
Blackpool F.C. players
Bundesliga players
2. Bundesliga players
3. Liga players
Regionalliga players
Eredivisie players
English Football League players
Premier League players
German expatriate footballers
German expatriate sportspeople in the Netherlands
Expatriate footballers in the Netherlands
German expatriate sportspeople in England
Expatriate footballers in England